Khaigam is a census village and Gram Panchayat in Pulwama district, Jammu & Kashmir, India.

According to the 2011 Census of India, Khaigam has a total population of 3,122 people including 1,588 males and 1,534 females with a literacy rate of 27.19%.

References 

Villages in Pulwama district